Auralog was a French company based in Paris that produced language education software under a brand called Tell Me More. It was bought by Rosetta Stone (company) in 2013.

Auralog's language-learning software
Like other language learning programs, Tell Me More gives students feedback about their pronunciation, based on speech recognition. It also provides graphs of pronunciation and intonation.

Available languages include: Spanish, French, German, Italian, Japanese, Chinese, Arabic, Dutch, and English as a foreign language.

See also
 Language education
 Language pedagogy

Notes

References
 . Retrieved 2 January 2013.

Companies established in 1987
Software companies of France
Companies based in Paris-Saclay